The Sri Lanka women's cricket team toured UAE from 9 to 13 January 2015. The tour included three One Day Internationals. The tour was part of the ICC Women's Championship. The tour also included three Women's Twenty20 International matches.

ODI series

1st ODI

2nd ODI

3rd ODI

T20I series

1st T20I

2nd T20I

3rd T20I

External links
 Series home at ESPN Cricinfo

References

2015 in Sri Lankan cricket
2015 in Pakistani cricket
Sri Lanka women's national cricket team tours
2014–16 ICC Women's Championship
2015 in women's cricket
Pakistan women's national cricket team